Ishaan: Sapno Ko Awaaz De is an Indian Musical television  Teen Sitcom  created by Red Chillies Idiot Box which aired on Disney Channel India from 15 May 2010 to 27 March 2011. It is a musical teen drama that focuses on a 15-year-old boy named Ishaan and the choices that he makes between music and his friends.

Plot 
Ishaan wants to be famous. Ishaan has to leave his school because of a fee paying problem and joins the school of which he won against the 'Karma Yatra' where everyone hates him. On the other hand, Kabir is thrown out as the lead singer of their band as he was trying to win the competition by offering bribes to the judges, and Ishaan, after becoming the friend of the band members, becomes the lead singer too. After rejecting the chance to be a solo superstar, Ishaan and his friends try to make it big on their own. The group soon learns that success comes with a price and with strong competition in the form of 'Baby Shasha'—the superstar! When faced with choices that could jeopardize his friendship with others, Ishaan makes the toughest decisions of his life. Ishaan also has a love interest, Shyla (Anisa Butt).

Cast
 Tapasvi Mehta as Ishaan Sharma
 Anisa Butt as Shyla
 Kishan Savjani as Ron
 Ayaz Ahmed as Pulkit
 Farhina Parvez as Munmun
 Rohan Shah as Mandy
 Nakul Roshan Sahdev as Kabir
 Sheena Bajaj Purohit as Himani
 Bharti Kumar as Twinkle
 Sana Makbul as Sara
 Priyal Gor as Tara
 Nikita More as Lara
 Shruti Ulfat as Ishaan's mother
 Neville Bharucha as Sunny
 Deval Trivedi as Bubbles
 Rajeev Paul as Shyla's Father/ School Coach
 Arshad Warsi as himself
 Shaan as himself

Music
The Music album of the series was launched on 29 March 2011. Music was provided by Anand Ranganathan and lyrics were penned by Irfan Siddiqui and P. A. Sreekanth. The album consists of 10 songs including a special bonus track by Bappi Lahiri.
Other than that there are total 25 songs listed below - 

01. Sapno Ko Awaaz De
02. Pyaari Yaari Dosti 
03. Dhinchak 
04. Owwa Owwa 
05. I'm The One (Kabir's Version)
06. Dil Ka Hai Jo Haal 
07. B.O.D.M.A.S. 
08. Khwaab Yeh Kal Ke 
09. Bhaage Shyla 
10. Munmun Ka Sapna 
11. Ishaan Is Just So Possible
12. Naya School 
13. I'm The One (Ishaan's Version)
14. Jo Pyaar Ho Gaya Hai (Acoustic) 
15. Sapno Ko Awaaz De (Rock Version) 
16. Mera Naam Hai Shasha 
17. Meri Kahaani 
18. Oh JD Aaj Toh Tera Birthday 
19. Dhoomtaara 
20. Dhoomtaara (Dance Mix) 
21. Chor Ho Tum 
22. Say Cheeze 
23. Jeetenge Aaj Bhi 
24. D.I.S.C.O. (Bonus Track) 
25. Ek Hain Hum (Disney Soundtrack)

References

Disney Channel (Indian TV channel) original programming
2010 Indian television series debuts
2011 Indian television series endings
Indian teen drama television series
Indian musical television series
Television shows set in Mumbai
Red Chillies Idiot Box